Shelbourne is a small town located near Maldon in Victoria, Australia. Murphys creek also runs through the southern part of the town.

History
The town was serviced by Shelbourne railway station until the late 1960s.

References

Towns in Victoria (Australia)
Shire of Loddon